The following is a list of some notable Old Runnymedians, i.e. former pupils of Runnymede College in Spain.

Royalty
Grand Duchess Maria Vladimirovna of Russia, Head of the Russian imperial family
Grand Duke George Mikhailovich of Russia, heir apparent of the Russian imperial family
Flavia de Hohenlohe-Langenburg y Medina, sister of the Duke of Medinaceli
 Sol Maria and Ana Luna of Orleans-Braganza daughters of the Princess of Brasil and Princess Consort of Yugoslavia María de la Gloria de Orleans-Braganza y Borbón-Dos Sicilias

Politics
Sean O'Curneen Cañas, former President of the Liberal Democratic Centre
Percival Manglano Albacar, former Economic Advisor to the President of the Community of Madrid

Academia
Elif Shafak, essayist and women's rights activist
Elizabeth Pisani, academic researcher

Arts
David Broza
Henrik Takkenberg, singer and composer
Vicky Larraz, singer and tv presenter
Gabino Diego, actor

Media
Rebecca Loos, former model

Sport
Felicity Galvez, Olympic gold-medalist swimmer
Simon Shaw MBE, rugby union player
Brooklyn Beckham, model and son of David Beckham
Romeo Beckham, son of David Beckham

Other
Rafael Lozano-Hemmer, electronic artist

References

Runnymedians